The Sigma 30 is an inertial navigation system produced by SAGEM for use with artillery applications including howitzers, multiple rocket launchers, mortars and light guns.  It is currently produced for more than 25 international programs, including France (CAESAR, 2R2M, MLRS), Serbia (Nora B 52), Sweden (FH77 BD, Archer), India (Pinaka MBRL), Polish PT-91M tank (build for Malaysia)  and the United States (topographic survey). 

Sigma 30 can also be integrated in more complex systems (Positioning and Azimuth Determination System).

References

External links
Jane's
Sagem Défense Sécurité Navigation Unit website

Avionics
Missile guidance
Navigational equipment